A special election was held in  on October 13, 1801, to fill a vacancy caused by the resignation of Albert Gallatin (DR) in May, 1801, prior to the first meeting of the 7th Congress, after being appointed Secretary of the Treasury.

Election results

See also 
 List of special elections to the United States House of Representatives

References 

Pennsylvania 1801 12
Pennsylvania 1801 12
1801 12
Pennsylvania 12
United States House of Representatives 12
United States House of Representatives 1801 12